Cavite State University (CvSU) is the premier university of the province of Cavite in the Philippines. The educational institution has ten other campuses spread all over the province.

The school was established initially as an intermediate school by the Thomasites, a group of American teachers brought by the United States during the early part of the American colonial period to revamp the system of education  in the country. By 1964, the school has grown into a college known as the Don Severino Agricultural College (DSAC). It became a university on January 22, 1998, and was renamed as the Cavite State University.

The Accrediting Agency of Chartered Colleges and Universities in the Philippines (AACCUP) recently conferred the award to Cavite State University (CvSU) as top performing state university during the annual national conference held at the Waterfront Cebu City Hotel, Cebu City, 7 – 9 March. In 2016, CvSU was also recognized as one of the top ten performing State Universities and Colleges in accreditation, capturing the rank 7 spot. The university is also one of the top three performing schools in the criminology program in the country.

Since then, the university has grown offering close to 100 curricular programs in the undergraduate and graduate levels. It has more than 25,000 students and 1,200 faculty and staff from all eleven campuses.

History

The state university was first established by the Thomasites as an intermediate school, named Indang Intermediate School in 1906 with C.E. Workman its first principal.  Subsequently, Americans Henry Wise and Joseph Coconower succeeded Workman as the school's principal. In 1915, the school had its first Filipino principal, Mariano Mondoñedo. The school's focused on vocational agriculture for boys and domestic science for girls. In 1918, the name of the school was changed to Indang Farming School.

As enrollment increased, the school site was expanded through the land donations of the citizens of Indang, including Francisco Ocampo and Don Severino de las Alas, Secretary of Interior during the Aguinaldo cabinet. In 1927, the school was renamed Indang Rural High School, during the incumbency of principal Simeon Madlangsakay. It first offered a secondary courses in vocational agriculture in 1923 and Home Economics in 1927.

In recognition of the generosity of Don Severino de las Alas to the community, the province of Cavite and the nation, the name of the institution was changed to Don Severino National Agricultural School in 1958 by a congressional action.

Don Severino Agricultural College
The agricultural school was converted into a state college in 1964 by virtue of Republic Act No. 3917. Under this Act, the school was given its own charter and became known as Don Severino Agricultural College (DSAC).

In 1967, Santiago M. Rolle was appointed as the first college president. In 1971, Certificate in Technical Agriculture was offered. Dr. Sotero L. Lasap designed a new logo for DSAC in 1978. Its shape is like a spaceship supposed to symbolize carrying DSAC to its desired destination.

During the preparatory stage from 1983–1987, Dr. Ruperto S Sangalang became the officer-in-charge and he was the president of CvSU for the longest period.

The transition stage from 1988–1992 strengthened the instructional, research and extension programs through the implementation of the Institutional Development Assistance and Cooperation Project.

Transition to University and expansion
Following a "universityhood" campaign period from 1993 to 1998, the school became a university on January 22, 1998, by virtue of the Republic Act No. 8468 and was renamed the Cavite State University (CvSU), elevating its four schools into colleges.

In 2002, Cavite College of Fisheries (CACOF) in Naic and Cavite College of Arts and Trade (CCAT) in Rosario were integrated into the Cavite State University system to become the CSU College of Fisheries and the CSU College of Arts and Trade, respectively. The Cavite City campus was launched in 2001, and a Memorandum of Understanding (MOU) was signed for the establishment of the Carmona campus in 2002. Subsequently, established are new campuses in other parts of Cavite - Imus campus (est. 2003), Trece Martires campus (est. 2005), Silang campus (est. 2006), Tanza campus (est. 2007), Bacoor campus (est. 2008) and General Trias campus (est.2012).

In 2015, CvSU opened its 12th campus in the Municipality of Maragondon, by virtue of an agreement between former Provincial Governor Juanito Victor Remulla and University President Divinia C. Chavez. On August 3 of the same year, the university was involved in controversy when then-Vice President of the Philippines Jejomar Binay, who was a candidate in the 2016 Philippine presidential elections, spoke at a student's assembly held in the campus gymnasium. An unnamed professor claimed that around 3,000 upperclassmen were required to attend the event. This is in the connection of his own State of the Nation Address (which is known as the "true" State of the Nation Address), where Binay is contradicting against the administration of then-President Noynoy Aquino for so called "numb and failed" administration, weeks after the final State of the Nation Address of the said administration before he steps down in office after the six-year term of the president ended.

Campuses

Laya at Diwa Monument

The Laya at Diwa brass artwork displayed at the main entrance to the Don Severino de las Alas Campus in Indang which is meant to represent the university's vision of "truth, excellence and service". The monument is a creation of Jonnel P. Castrillo of Imus, Cavite. It was inaugurated on December 15, 2006, by Senator Edgardo J. Angara on the occasion of the university's centenary celebration.

There are five basic elements in the artwork together with the symbolic figures, which are subject to one's interpretation. The first is the unchained female figure, holding a book, her arms interlocked with the male figure.  The male figure holds a pen and a torch. The flame of the torch carries the letters CvSU for Cavite State University. The child figure, in a dynamic pose atop the pillar behind the male & female figure, reaching out a dove, the universal symbol peace and freedom.

The central pillar is deeply rooted in history as depicted by the murals on the sides of the base. The murals show the important historical events that took place in the province of Cavite and throughout the Philippines showing Filipino's life and spirit under imperial Spain and other colonizers including their continuing struggle for freedom and independence.  Laya at Diwa is mounted on a CvSU logo-shaped base.

See also
Cavite State University Cavite City Campus
Cavite State University Rosario Campus

References

External links

Cavite State University (Official Website)
CvSU Hymn Youtube Video

Universities and colleges in Cavite
State universities and colleges in the Philippines
Philippine Association of State Universities and Colleges
Educational institutions established in 1906
1906 establishments in the Philippines